Coastal regions of a territory are often the most densely populated due to their greater economic productivity or colonial history.  This leads to a contrast with the interior of the territory, which is (or was) sparsely populated.  Examples include:
 British Columbia Interior, commonly called "The Interior", the inland areas of British Columbia, Canada, including but not limited to:
 The Interior Plateau, official name of the parts of British Columbia between the Coast Mountains and the Columbia Mountains and the Canadian Rockies, and south of the Interior Mountains
 The Columbia Plateau, Washington, USA, sometimes referred to as the "Interior Plateau"
 The Alaska Interior, a largely wilderness area, encompassing most of the state
 Interior Division, an administrative division of Sabah, east Malaysia, on the island of Borneo
 U.S. Interior Highlands, a mountainous region spanning eastern Oklahoma, western and northern Arkansas, southern Missouri, and the extreme southeast corner of Kansas
 Interior Plains, a vast physiographic region that spreads across the Laurentian craton of North America

See also
Hinterland